Rafael 'Rafa' Paz Marín (born 2 August 1965) is a Spanish former professional footballer who played mainly as a right midfielder.

Club career
Paz was born in Puebla de Don Fadrique, Province of Granada. After starting out as a youth with CP Granada 74 he signed with neighbours Sevilla FC still as a junior, going on to appear in 386 competitive games with the club and score 27 goals. In the 1989–90 season, while playing all the matches safe one, he netted a career-best six times, helping the Andalusians to finish sixth in La Liga with the subsequent qualification for the UEFA Cup.
 
Upon Sevilla's relegation in 1997, Paz moved to Mexico, closing out his career after one season with Atlético Celaya, where he teamed up with former fellow internationals Emilio Butragueño and Rafael Martín Vázquez.

International career
Paz represented Spain on seven occasions, all in 1990, and was included in the squad for the 1990 FIFA World Cup where he took part in two matches. His debut came on 21 February, in a friendly against Czechoslovakia.

Honours
Spain U20
FIFA U-20 World Cup runner-up: 1985

References

External links

1965 births
Living people
Sportspeople from the Province of Granada
Spanish footballers
Footballers from Andalusia
Association football midfielders
La Liga players
Tercera División players
Sevilla Atlético players
Sevilla FC players
Liga MX players
Club Celaya footballers
Spain youth international footballers
Spain under-21 international footballers
Spain international footballers
1990 FIFA World Cup players
Spanish expatriate footballers
Expatriate footballers in Mexico
Spanish expatriate sportspeople in Mexico